Maui Nui or Greater Maui, is a modern geologists' name given to a prehistoric Hawaiian Island built from seven shield volcanoes. Nui means "great/large" in the Hawaiian language.

Sea levels were lower than today's, due to distant glaciation locking up the Earth's water during ice ages, thus exposing more land. As the volcanoes slowly settled by subsidence, due to the weight of the shield volcanoes and erosion, the saddles between them slowly flooded, forming four islands: Maui, Molokai, Lānai, and Kahoolawe by about 200,000 years ago. Another former volcanic island lying west of Molokai was completely submerged, and covered with a cap of coral; it is now known as Penguin Bank.

But at the outer edges of former Maui Nui, as with the edges of all Hawaiian Islands, the sea floor plummets to the abyssal ocean floor of the Pacific Ocean. The steep slopes can result in massive landslides due to flank collapse, including one which removed most of the northern half of East Molokai.

Administratively, the current islands remaining from Maui Nui comprise Maui County (except a tiny part of Molokai, which comprises Kalawao County).

Maui Nui was formed in the Pleistocene Epoch which lasted from around 2 million years ago to about 11,000 years ago.

See also

 Santa Rosae

References

 
Geology of Hawaii
Islands of Hawaii
Former islands of the United States
Physical oceanography
Volcanism of Hawaii
Geography of Hawaii
Geography of Maui County, Hawaii
Cenozoic Hawaii